17 Persei is a single star in the northern constellation of Perseus, located about 390 light years away from the Sun. It is visible to the naked eye as a faint, orange-hued star with an apparent visual magnitude of 4.53. This object is moving further from the Earth at a heliocentric radial velocity of +13 km/s.

Based upon a stellar classification of K5+III, this is an evolved giant star that has exhausted the hydrogen at its core. It is a suspected variable star, with an amplitude of 0.012 magnitude and period 4.4 days. The star has 1.3 times the mass of the Sun and has expanded to nearly 52 times the Sun's radius. It is radiating 551 times the luminosity of the Sun from its enlarged photosphere at an effective temperature of 4,000 K.

References

K-type giants
Suspected variables
Perseus (constellation)
BD+34 527
Persei, 17
017709
013328
0843